Texas Buddies is a 1932 American Western film written and directed by Robert North Bradbury. The film stars Bob Steele, Nancy Drexel, Francis McDonald, Harry Semels, George "Gabby" Hayes and William Dyer. The film was released on October 19, 1932, by Sono Art-World Wide Pictures.

Plot

1919: Ted Garner is just returned from overseas service with the United States Army Air Service, too late for World War I flying. His friend Si Haller informs him that his Aunt who raised him has died, his land his gone, his girl has married someone else and his horse has been sold to Ken Kincaid.

Driving through the desert, they view an airplane in trouble that comes down in a forced landing. Unknown to the pilot and his passenger June Collins, their plane has been sabotaged in order to rob the money they are carrying. Both the pilot and the passenger are wounded by an attempted robbery that Ted and Si thwart with their six guns. They also discover that June's uncle has been murdered. As June as never met him, Ted talks Si into impersonating him as June recovers.

Ted wins his land and horse back in gambling, then goes after Kincaid.

Cast           
Bob Steele as Ted Garner
Nancy Drexel as June Collins
Francis McDonald as Blake
Harry Semels as Ken Kincaid
George "Gabby" Hayes as Si Haller 
William Dyer as Sheriff 
Dick Dickinson as Burns 
Slade Hurlbert as Buck Gregg

References

External links
 

1932 films
1930s English-language films
American Western (genre) films
1932 Western (genre) films
Films directed by Robert N. Bradbury
Films set in 1919
American black-and-white films
1930s American films
American aviation films